Felipe Hernández Vélez (born 1960) is a Spanish poet, novelist and musician.

Life and work
He was born in 1960 to an American father and a Spanish mother. His father's abandonment of the family has marked Hernandez Velez's work, with its recurring themes of loss and identity. In 1976, he moved to Mallorca for familial reasons. He had already started to write poetry, and received the Ciutat de Palma prize in 1981 for his first book of poems Crònica dels argonautes. He dropped out of the University of the Balearic Islands and became a school teacher in Sóller, a mountainous town in the north of Mallorca.

In 1985, he gave up his job as a teacher to focus on his novel Naturaleza, the writing of which took him three years. The novel was published by Anagrama in 1989, and was a finalist for the Premio Herralde. He published several more novels in the 1990s and early 2000s, since when he has concentrated much more on his musical career.

Literary work
1981 Crònica dels Argonautes (Crónica de los Argonautas), poesía, editorial Tafal, 1981, 
1989 Naturaleza, novela, finalista premio Herralde, editorial Anagrama, 1989, 
1992 El guarda nocturno, relatos
1994 Inundación, relatos, Caja España, 
1998 La Deuda, novela, editorial Planeta, 
1999 La Partitura, novela, editorial Seix Barral, 
2000 Edén, novela, novela, editorial Seix Barral, 
2002 Dunas, novela, editorial Bitzoc, premio Juan March Cencillo (enlace roto disponible en Internet Archive; véase el historial y la última versión).,

Musical work
1984 Voice exercices, ambient music
1985 Siete medidas de tiempo, música para la exposición de Lluís Juncosa en la galería Metrònom de Barcelona
1993 Música para caminar dormido, ambient music
1998 Música para escenas familiares, para la exposición del mismo nombre de Luis Pérez-Mínguez y Antoni Socías
2001 Dance & Machine, música para la obra de danza contemporánea Bobot
2002 Alicia a través del espejo, música para un ballet de danza contemporánea
2005 El flexionista, música para el video O Flexionista, dentro de la exposición Socias2, de Antoni y Enric Socías
2007 Poetry & Insects, música y poesía
2009 Un corazón de noche, música y poesía
2009 Meditation vol. 1: Evanescence, Música para meditación y sanación
2010 Meditation vol.2: Reiki Waves, Música para meditación y sanación
2010 Meditation 3 vol.3: Healing & Premonition, Música para meditación y sanaciónhttp://www.myspace.com/soulmeridian2

References

21st-century Spanish writers
University of the Balearic Islands alumni
Living people
1960 births